In the Precious Age is the seventh studio album by Japanese singer/songwriter Mari Hamada, released on September 1, 1987 by Invitation. Produced by Mike Clink, it is Hamada's first album to be recorded outside Japan. It features collaborations with Bobby Caldwell and Toto members Mike and Jeff Porcaro. The album was reissued alongside Hamada's past releases on January 15, 2014.

In the Precious Age peaked at No. 29 on Oricon's albums chart.

Track listing

Charts

Personnel 
 Michael Landau – guitar
 Tim Pierce – guitar
 Dan Huff – guitar
 John Pierce – bass
 Mike Porcaro – bass
 Bill Cuomo – keyboards
 John Van Tongeren – keyboards
 Jeff Porcaro – drums
 John Keane – drums, backing vocals
 Mark Droubay – drums
 Myron Grombacker – drums
 Bobby Caldwell – backing vocals

References

External links 
  (Mari Hamada)
  (Victor Entertainment)
 
 

1987 albums
Japanese-language albums
Mari Hamada albums
Albums produced by Mike Clink
Victor Entertainment albums